Kléver Rodrigo Gomes Rufino (born 20 July 1989), simply known as Kléver, is a Brazilian footballer who plays for Boavista as a goalkeeper.

Career
Born in Mirassol, São Paulo, Kléver joined Fluminense's youth system in 2006, aged 15. He made his senior debuts while on loan to Volta Redonda in 2011. In April, after returning to Flu, Kléver was definitely promoted to the main squad, but behind Ricardo Berna and Diego Cavalieri.

On 6 October 2013, after Berna's departure and Cavalieri's call-up to the national side, he was selected ahead of new signing Felipe and played his first match as a professional, starting in a 0–1 loss at Internacional.

Honours
Fluminense
Campeonato Brasileiro Série A: ´2012

Atlético Goianiense
Campeonato Brasileiro Série B: 2016

References

External links

1989 births
Living people
People from Mirassol
Brazilian footballers
Association football goalkeepers
Campeonato Brasileiro Série A players
Campeonato Brasileiro Série B players
Fluminense FC players
Volta Redonda FC players
Atlético Clube Goianiense players
Footballers from São Paulo (state)